Repo Men is a 2010 science fiction action film directed by Miguel Sapochnik, starring Jude Law, Forest Whitaker, Liev Schreiber, Alice Braga and Carice van Houten. An American-Canadian production, it is based on the novel The Repossession Mambo by Eric Garcia, and follows a repo man who goes on the run after he becomes the recipient of an artificial heart and finds himself suffering the same fate as his victims. The film was theatrically released on March 19, 2010.

Plot
In 2025, advancements in medical technology have perfected bio-mechanical organs. A corporation known as The Union sells these expensive "artiforgs" on credit, and when customers are unable or unwilling to pay for their artiforgs The Union sends "repo men" to locate and forcibly repossess the organ - invariably resulting in the death of the owner.

Remy (Jude Law) and his partner, Jake Freivald (Forest Whitaker), are considered the best of the Union's repo men. However, Remy's wife Carol disapproves of his work, believing that it is a bad influence for their son Peter. At a family barbecue, Remy allows Jake to discreetly perform a repossession nearby, but is caught by Carol who leaves with Peter in anger.
While patrolling with Jake, the duo discovers a "nest", a refuge for Union customers who have defaulted on payments for their artiforgs and are attempting to escape the country. Remy and Jake raid the nest by themselves, impressing their boss, Frank. He offers them the opportunity to become full-time raid captains. Remy declines and attempts to ask Frank to transfer to sales, but Jake cuts him off. Jake tells Remy that what they do is important, but Remy's mind is made up. Jake suggests that Remy's last job be a musician that Remy is a fan of. After helping the musician finish one last song, he uses a defibrillator in order to stop the artificial heart, but the device malfunctions, and Remy is severely injured, requiring replacement of his heart with an artiforg.

Carol divorces Remy for taking another job, so he moves in with Jake.  As he tries to go back to work, he realizes he's developed sympathy for the customers, unable to lie when he tries sales, but also unable to kill when repossessing their artiforgs. He's soon unable to make the payments on his heart and is in debt.  Jake discovers that Remy has not been repossessing and takes him to a "nest" with enough artiforgs to clear his debt; however, Remy cannot do the job. Furious, Jake demands he stay there until he gets over his inhibition. A stunned debtor wakes up and knocks Remy out.

Waking up, Remy encounters Beth, a singer he would see while drinking in a bar with Jake. He takes her to a motel room and discovers she has numerous artiforgs. Breaking into the office, Remy attempts to clear Beth's and his own accounts, but he is interrupted by Jake, who lets him leave. On the run, Beth and Remy leave for the abandoned outskirts of the city. Beth tells Remy of how she contracted various diseases and was involved in a car crash, and was forced to resort to buying artiforgs on the black market after running up severe debts. They begin a relationship, and Remy decides to document his life as a repo man with an old typewriter Beth found. As he works on a manuscript, he is interrupted by a repo man. Remy sets a trap and the collector drops through a hole in the floor. Beth falls through the same hole, damaging her prosthetic knee. Before the collector can shoot Beth, Remy manages to kill him.

Remy sneaks into his former workplace to obtain scanning jammers he had confiscated during his raid on the nest. He attempts to force Frank to clear his account, only to discover that accounts can now only be cleared at the Union's central office due to his earlier attempt. Remy and Beth attempt to flee the country at the airport, but security is alerted by bleeding from Beth's knee. A fight with airport security ensues. Jake arrives, but is on the other side of a security panel and watches their escape. They go to a black market doctor to replace Beth's knee.

After the procedure, they are stopped by Jake who tries to convince Remy to rejoin him as a repo man. Remy refuses, and Jake reveals he rigged the defibrillator unit that caused his heart to fail, so Remy would continue to work with him. They fight, and Jake knocks Remy unconscious. Beth awakens Remy, saying she stunned Jake as an organ repossession raid is underway. They flee to an underground residence where Remy is subdued by a freedom fighter (Yvette Nicole Brown). Later Remy decides to delete the accounts of all implant clients. Remy meets Carol and Peter on a train one last time, passing on his manuscript to Peter.

Remy and Beth break into Union headquarters and are forced to fight their way through the facility to the Union's database. Using Beth's prosthetic eye, they enter and seal themselves inside as Jake and Frank arrive. The server's only interface is an organ scanner, requiring Remy and Beth to cut themselves open to use the scanner internally on each of their artiforgs, clearing their accounts. Frank and Jake enter the server room using an artiforg from one of the slain repo men, finding Beth near death and Remy attempting to scan her heart. Jake is ordered to kill Remy, but he instead kills Frank and helps revive Beth. Jake tosses two grenades into the artiforg drawer of the server, with the explosion destroying the mainframe, wiping the records of everyone who has an account with the Union.

Later, Remy is seen on a tropical beach, enjoying his freedom with Beth and Jake. His text has been published as a book, The Repossession Mambo. While Remy talks to Jake, he notices that Jake suddenly disappears, leaving Remy's book on his chair; then Remy sees the beach flicker with static before returning to normal. It is revealed that Remy is in a coma, having sustained severe brain damage when Jake knocked him unconscious. Jake has paid off Remy's debt for his heart and also paid to link his brain to a neural network, allowing him to live out his life peacefully in a computer generated dream world. Beth is unconscious, and Jake says he will take care of her; he then says a sorrowful goodbye to Remy. The film ends with Frank delivering a sales pitch for the neural network.

Cast
 Jude Law as Remy, a repo man.
 Forest Whitaker as Jake Freivald, Remy's partner. 
 Liev Schreiber as Frank Mercer, Remy's boss.
 Alice Braga as Beth, a singer who has multiple artificial organs.
 Carice van Houten as Carol, Remy's wife.
 Chandler Canterbury as Peter, Remy's son.
 RZA as T-Bone, a soul musician in debt.
 Yvette Nicole Brown as Rhodesia, the leader of an underground residence.
 John Leguizamo as Asbury, a black-market organs dealer.
 Liza Lapira as Alva, a black-market surgeon's assistant.
 Joe Pingue as Raymond Pearl, Remy's co-worker sent out to repo his heart.
 Tiffany Espensen as Young Alva.

Production
In 2007, screenwriters Eric Garcia and Garrett Lerner began working with Miguel Sapochnik on a screenplay based on a novel being written by Garcia. The novel, Repossession Mambo, was published March 31, 2009.

In June 2007, Universal Studios cast Jude Law and Forest Whitaker. Production began in September 2007. Casting for this film was done by Mindy Marin, production design by David Sandefur, art direction by Dan Yarhi, set decoration by Clive Thomasson, and costume design by Caroline Harris. Filming took place in Toronto, and the Greater Toronto Area in Ontario.

Fight choreography was done by Hiro Koda and Jeff Imada. Forest Whitaker has been a longtime student of Filipino Martial Arts under Dan Inosanto and it is featured heavily in the vicious blade and blunt-weapon fight scenes in the film.

The score was composed by Marco Beltrami, who recorded his score with the Hollywood Studio Symphony at the Newman Scoring Stage at 20th Century Fox.

Release
Repo Men was released theatrically in the United States and Canada on March 19, 2010, having been moved up from an original release date of April 2, 2010. The film was promoted with a seven-minute comic released on Apple.com on March 15, 2010.

The unrated DVD and Blu-ray Disc was released on July 27, 2010.

Reception

Critical response
Reviews were generally negative. Review aggregation website Rotten Tomatoes gives a score of 22% based on 154 reviews, with an average rating of 4.40/10. The site's consensus is that "Repo Men has an intriguing premise, as well as a likable pair of leads, but they're wasted on a rote screenplay, indifferent direction, and mind-numbing gore."

Metacritic, which assigns a weighted average score out of 1–100 reviews from film critics, has a rating score of 32% based on 31 reviews.

Box office
Repo Men opened at #4 in its debut weekend in North America with US$6,126,170 in 2,521 theaters, averaging US$2,430 per theater. The film eventually grossed US$17,805,837 worldwide—US$13,794,835 in North America and US$4,011,002 in other territories. In July 2010, Parade Magazine listed the film as the #7 on its list of "Biggest Box Office Flops of 2010 (So Far)."

In the United States and Canada, Repo Men was released alongside The Bounty Hunter and Diary of a Wimpy Kid.

See also
Elysium (film)
Repo! The Genetic Opera, a film involving a similar plotline regarding the repossession of transplanted organs

References

External links
 
 
 
 
 

2010 films
2010 action thriller films
2010s chase films
2010 science fiction action films
American action thriller films
American chase films
American science fiction action films
American dystopian films
Films set in 2025
Films set in Toronto
Films shot in Hamilton, Ontario
Films shot in Toronto
Relativity Media films
Universal Pictures films
Films scored by Marco Beltrami
Films produced by Scott Stuber
Biopunk films
Cyberpunk films
2010 directorial debut films
Films about simulated reality
2010s English-language films
2010s American films